Andre Jesse Rampersad (born 2 February 1995) is a Trinidadian professional footballer who plays as a midfielder for Canadian club HFX Wanderers.

Club career

Santa Rosa
Rampersad spent eight years with TT Super League side FC Santa Rosa. In 2012, he was named MVP of the Super League U17 division. In 2013–14, he scored one goal, and scored another two the following season. In 2018, he made eighteen appearances and scored three goals for Santa Rosa, on route to his first Super League title.

HFX Wanderers
On 10 January 2019, Rampersad signed with Canadian Premier League side HFX Wanderers, rejoining former Santa Rosa manager Derek King, who had joined Wanderers as an assistant under Stephen Hart. On 28 April 2019, Rampersad made his professional debut as a starter in the Wanderers' inaugural match. On 20 June 2019, he scored his first goal for the club in a 2–1 loss to Cavalry FC. That season Rampersad scored one goal in 25 league appearances, in addition to five appearances in the Canadian Championship. On 14 November 2019, he re-signed with Halifax for the 2020 season.

For the 2020 season, Rampersad was named the team captain for the Wanderers. After the 2022 season the Wanderers announced they had signed Rampersad to a contract extension through 2024, with an option for 2025.

International career
In May 2021, Rampersad was invited to a Trinidad and Tobago training camp, but however due to travel restrictions in Canada due to the COVID-19 pandemic he was unable to join the squad.

In March 2023 Rampersad received another call-up to Trinidad ahead of CONCACAF Nations League matches against the Bahamas and Nicaragua.

Career statistics

Honours
Santa Rosa
TT Super League: 2018
HFX Wanderers
 Canadian Premier League
Runners-up: 2020

Individual
TT Super League U17 Division Most Valuable Player: 2012

References

External links

1995 births
Living people
Association football midfielders
Trinidad and Tobago footballers
People from Arima
Trinidad and Tobago expatriate footballers
Expatriate soccer players in Canada
Trinidad and Tobago expatriate sportspeople in Canada
HFX Wanderers FC players
TT Super League players
Canadian Premier League players
Trinidad and Tobago people of Indian descent